Stephen Evans CMG OBE (born 29 June 1950) is a British diplomat who has been on secondment since 2011 as NATO Assistant Secretary General for Operations.

Career

Stephen Nicholas Evans was educated at King's College, Taunton, then gained a BA degree from Bristol University. He served a three-year "short service commission" as a Lieutenant in the Royal Tank Regiment 1971–74 before joining the Foreign and Commonwealth Office (FCO). After studying Vietnamese language at the School of Oriental and African Studies he was Head of Chancery and Consul at Hanoi 1978–80. After Thai language training he was First Secretary at Bangkok 1983–86. He was Head of the Political Section at the Embassy in Turkey 1990–93, Counsellor Economic at the British High Commission in Pakistan 1993–96, and on secondment with the United Nations Special Mission to Afghanistan 1996–97.

Evans returned to London in 1997 as Head of the OSCE/Council of Europe Department at the FCO. In 1998, he moved within the FCO to become Head of the South Asia Department, before being appointed Chargé d'affaires in Kabul, Afghanistan, in 2001. He moved to become British High Commissioner to Sri Lanka and the Maldives, based in Colombo, Sri Lanka, in 2002.

Between 2006 and 2007, Evans was the British Ambassador to Afghanistan in Kabul; returning to the FCO in 2007 as Director of Afghanistan Information Strategy.

He spent the academic year 2007–08 at Corpus Christi College, Cambridge, gaining the degree of Master of Philosophy in Historical Studies.  He then resumed his diplomatic career, serving as High Commissioner to Bangladesh 2008–11. In 2011 he was seconded to NATO as Assistant Secretary General for Operations.

Honours

Evans was appointed OBE in the 1994 New Year Honours, and CMG "in recognition of services in support of operations in Afghanistan" in 2002.

Family

In 1975, Evans married Sharon Ann Holdcroft, with whom he has a son and two daughters.

References

EVANS, Stephen Nicholas, Who's Who 2013, A & C Black, 2013; online edn, Oxford University Press, Dec 2012
Mr Stephen Evans, CMG, OBE, Debrett's People of Today
Biography: Stephen Evans, Assistant Secretary General for Operations, NATO

 

1950 births
Living people
People educated at King's College, Taunton
Alumni of the University of Bristol
Alumni of Corpus Christi College, Cambridge
Alumni of SOAS University of London
High Commissioners of the United Kingdom to Sri Lanka
High Commissioners of the United Kingdom to the Maldives
Ambassadors of the United Kingdom to Afghanistan
High Commissioners of the United Kingdom to Bangladesh
NATO officials
Companions of the Order of St Michael and St George
Officers of the Order of the British Empire